Red Bank may refer to:
Red Bank, Halifax County, Virginia
Red Bank, Northampton County, Virginia